Jesper Alsing Larsen (born 29 October 1972) is a badminton player from Denmark who affiliated with Hvidovre BK. He won the men's doubles gold medal along with partner Jens Eriksen at the 2000 European Championships. Larsen and Eriksen competed at the 2000 Summer Olympics in Sydney, Australia, and finished in the quarter-finals stage.

Achievements

European Championships 
Men's doubles

IBF World Grand Prix 
The World Badminton Grand Prix sanctioned by International Badminton Federation (IBF) from 1983 to 2006.

Men's doubles

IBF International 
Men's doubles

Mixed doubles

References

External links 
 
 

1972 births
Living people
People from Faaborg-Midtfyn Municipality
Danish male badminton players
Badminton players at the 2000 Summer Olympics
Olympic badminton players of Denmark
World No. 1 badminton players
Sportspeople from the Region of Southern Denmark